John van Ruysbroeck College (Dutch, Jan-van-Ruusbroeckollege) is a Roman Catholic secondary school in Laeken. It was founded by the Society of Jesus and is named after John van Ruysbroeck.

History
It was founded in 1968 as a boys-only school. In 1994, it became co-educational.

The school is governed by a non-profit association and belongs to a group of  seven Jesuit colleges who offer private counselling. In 1999, the college joined together with St John Berchmans College in Brussels to start this scheme.

In the 2017-2018 school year, the college had 720 students.

Notable former pupils
Bert Anciaux
Bart Verhaeghe
Peter Van Asbroeck

See also
 List of Jesuit sites in Belgium
 Archdiocese of Mechelen–Brussels

References

External links
 John of Ruysbroeck College site

Secondary schools in Brussels
Jesuit secondary schools in Belgium